Fatih Egedik (born 2 May 1982) is a Turkish former professional footballer who played as a defensive midfielder. Egedik was also a youth international. He studied at Ege University.

Club career
Egedik started in 2000 with Altai as a defensive midfielder. At the end of 2008, he was transferred to Konyaspor'a. He played hired in 2009 by Manisaspor'da. Konyaspor'un terminated its contract with the Super League player. In 2010, he was transferred to Mersin Dormitory then went to Altay'a in 2011.

References

1982 births
Living people
Turkish footballers
Turkey youth international footballers
Turkey under-21 international footballers
Association football midfielders
Altay S.K. footballers
Denizlispor footballers
Konyaspor footballers
Manisaspor footballers
Mersin İdman Yurdu footballers
Süper Lig players
Ege University alumni